Pronina is a rural locality (a village) in Leninskoye Rural Settlement, Kudymkarsky District, Perm Krai, Russia. The population was 37 as of 2010.

Geography

References

Rural localities in Kudymkarsky District